The 1917 All-Ireland Senior Hurling Championship Final was the thirtieth All-Ireland Final and the culmination of the 1917 All-Ireland Senior Hurling Championship, an inter-county hurling tournament for the top teams in Ireland. Dublin were the winners. It took place on 28 October 1917.

References
 Corry, Eoghan, The GAA Book of Lists (Hodder Headline Ireland, 2005).
 Donegan, Des, The Complete Handbook of Gaelic Games (DBA Publications Limited, 2005).

1
All-Ireland Senior Hurling Championship Finals
Dublin GAA matches
Tipperary GAA matches
All-Ireland Senior Hurling Championship Final
All-Ireland Senior Hurling Championship Final, 1917